Montella is an Italian town and comune (municipality) in the province of Avellino, Campania.

Montella may also refer to:

Montella (weevil), a beetle genus in the tribe Apostasimerini
Vincenzo Montella, Italian football player and coach

See also
 Montello (disambiguation)

Italian-language surnames